Chantha is a 1995 Indian Malayalam-language action film directed by Sunill and written by Robin Thirumala. The film stars Babu Antony, Thilakan, Sathaar, and Augustine. The film has a musical score by M. Jayachandran. This film was the third highest-grossing Malayalam film of the year behind The King and Spadikam.

Plot
Sekhar Joseph is an honest and upright police officer in Kozhikode City. He imprisons the minister Keshavan Nair's nephew and his high-profile friends for running over a child in the street due to drunken driving. The corrupt Commissioner Ravishankar tries to get Sekhar to release them, but Sekhar refuses. Later, the minister himself visits the station and commends Sekhar for his honest actions, while simultaneously reprimanding Ravishankar. 

At the city market, Mammali, a shrewd trader, brings in people from the outside to unload material for his shop, against the market's rules. Sulthan, the leader of the market workers and a local ruffian, confronts Mammali's men and drives them away. Mammali's partner Ummer Haji, a cunning businessman, tries to influence Sulthan to no avail. He makes Mammali file a complaint to the police against Sulthan. When Sekhar Joseph tries to arrest Sulthan, he cannot take him away from the market due to stiff opposition from the masses, who regard him as their savior. Ummer Haji tries to take over a building in the market for his activities but is humiliated and driven away by Sulthan and his gang. Furious, Ummer Haji calls for their leader Alexander, who flies in from outside the state. Alexander has Mammali stabbed to death by his accomplices and plans to pin the murder on Sulthan. However, this plan is foiled by Merlin Joseph, Sekhar Joseph's journalist sister, when she takes a photo of Alexander's henchman stabbing Mammali, thus confirming Sulthan’s innocence.

To get back at Merlin and silence her, Alexander and his gang break into Sekhar's home one night and kill his wife and daughter by poisoning them. When Alexander goes to question him at his house, he has Alexander beaten up by his men and run a vehicle over one of his legs, Incapacitating him. Left for death on the roadside, Sulthan saves Sekhar and takes him to the hospital. He then saves Sekhar from the doctor, who also tries to kill him on Alexander's orders. Sulthan brings Sekhar to his house, where he slowly starts recovering with Merlin and Sulthan’s mother's care. 

Meanwhile, Ummar Haji has an altercation with Minister Keshavan Nair, since he is not doing anything in his capacity to move things at the market to Alexander and the gang's favor. To meet his end, he has the minister's nephew Renjith humiliate the minister at his residence after a press conference by getting a notorious prostitute inside his bedroom and making it public. Keshavan Nair resigns out of party pressure and goes back to the market where he started his public life. 

Sulthan and Sekhar want to avenge this ill-doing, and they capture the prostitute, Ramlabeevi, out of whom they beat and record a confession. However, their plan is thwarted by Alexander, who explodes Ramlabeevi's car as she is on her way to court, killing her. To further attack Sulthan they kill his favorite child in the locality, Thithibeevi, with a time bomb. Sulthan, now bent on getting revenge, starts killing Alexander's gang one by one, starting with Renjith and Ummer Haji. The police try to find Sulthan by raiding the market, but are not successful. Alexander murders Keshavan Nair when he unsuccessfully tries to question him of Sulthan’s whereabouts. He kidnaps Sultan's mother and sister. Sulthan gets into his hideout and beats up Alexander's men. In the end, Sekhar Joseph and Sulthan together kill Alexander.

Cast 
Babu Antony as Sulthan
Thilakan as Minister Keshavan Nair
Sathaar as Commissioner Ravishanker
Augustine as Mammali
Devan as Alexander
Lalu Alex as CI Sekher Joseph
Mohini as Merlin Joseph
Narendra Prasad as Guest in a song
Sadiq as Mayinkutty
Renuka as Sherly
T. S. Krishnan as Renjith
Kozhikode Narayanan Nair as P. C. Gopi
Abu Salim as Williams
VK Sreeraman as Ummer Haji
Santhakumari as Sulthan's umma
Anila Sreekumar as Laila
Baby Ambili as Thithibeevi
Bindu Varappuzha as Ramlabeevi

Soundtrack 
The music was composed by M. Jayachandran and the lyrics were written by Gireesh Puthenchery.

References 

1995 films
1990s Malayalam-language films
Films scored by M. Jayachandran
Films shot in Kozhikode